The National Soccer League (Chicago), formed by the merger of the Chicago Soccer League and International Soccer Football League of Chicago in 1928, is a semi-professional U.S. soccer league which is the oldest continuously operating soccer league in the United States.

History
In 1904, the Association Football League of Chicago (AFLC) was established as an ethnic British league in Chicago, Illinois. While the AFL, and others like it, catered to the British and Irish expatriate communities, there were few opportunities available to the rest of Chicago's many immigrant groups to play organized, competitive soccer. In 1913, the Chicago Soccer League came into existence. In 1915, it merged with the AFLC to form the Chicago and District Association Football League (CDAFL). However, this new league was better known as the Chicago Soccer League. In 1919, several non-British teams left the CDAFL to form the International Soccer League. This league lasted only one year, but led to the founding of the International Soccer Football League in 1920. That year the ISFL, with Frank Foldi as its president, was created to address the lack of league opportunities for non-British teams. With teams from nearly every significant ethnic group in Chicago, the ISFL quickly established itself as a major player in Chicago soccer.  The league grew in strength as most of the city's other amateur and semi-professional league collapsed. In 1924, Carl Johnson of the ISFL's Swedish-Americans, became the first U.S. player from outside the north-east capped by the national team. In 1930, the ISFL created a junior division to give young players an opportunity to develop their talents at a high level en route to a spot on a first division roster. This served to enhance the league's stability as it grew its own talent pool. In 1938, only the Chicago Soccer League and the International Soccer Football League remained as the top two city leagues. That year, they merged to form the National Soccer League of Chicago.

World War II hit the NSL hard as most of the top players were inducted in the armed forces. However, the end of the war brought a renaissance when those men returned from the military, to be quickly followed by western and central European immigrants fleeing the devastation caused by the war. A few years later, another wave of immigrants, this time Eastern Europeans fleeing communism, brought another fresh group of talented players into the NSL.  These waves of immigration led to an expansion of the league into multiple divisions including junior and youth teams. While centered on Chicago, the league expanded to include teams from towns surrounding the city.

In 1950, the National Soccer League created the first indoor soccer league in the United States. Chicago leagues had played indoor tournaments for decades but this was the first time an annual competitive indoor season was founded. The league featured twelve teams with games broadcast live on radio. This indoor adjunct of the NSL was continued until 1968. That year, the North American Soccer League was created as a division one league. While the NASL struggled at times and ultimately folded in 1984, it created a national league which drew the best U.S. players away from the traditional regional and city leagues which had dominated U.S. soccer. This brought the slow eclipse of the National Soccer League of Chicago as a major player in U.S. soccer. The collapse of the NASL in 1984 brought a brief resurgence to the NSL, but the founding of Major League Soccer in 1996, along with the merger of the A-League  and USISL in 1997 to form the USL First Division led to the decline of the NSL. The league continues as a local recreational league, but its teams are no longer the competitive force on the national level they once were.

The NSL, in response to the COVID-19 pandemic in March 2020, cancelled the last two rounds of matches in indoor play as well as the playoffs. Later, the outdoor season would be cancelled as well. This marked the first time in the NSL's century-long history since World War II a season would not be played.

Champions

International Soccer Football League
 1922 Sparta Union
 1923 Olympia
 1928 Chicago Sparta
 1930 Chicago Sparta
 1931 Chicago Sparta
 1932 Chicago Sparta
 1933 Chicago Sparta
 1934 Chicago Sparta
 1935 Chicago Sparta
 1936 Chicago Sparta

National Soccer League
 1938 Chicago Sparta
 1944 Hakoah Center
 1948 Vikings
 1949 A.A.C. Eagles
 1950 A.A.C. Eagles
 1951 Chicago Slovak
 1952 Chicago Slovak
 1953 Ukrainian Lions
 1954 (tie) A.A.C. Eagles, Ukrainian Lions and Chicago Slovak
 1955 Schwaben
 1956 (tie) A.A.C. Eagles, Ukrainian Lions and Schwaben
 1957 Schwaben
 1958 Schwaben
 1959 Schwaben
 1960 Schwaben
 1961 Maroons
 1962 Maroons
 1963 Schwaben
 1964 Kickers
 1965 Hansa
 1966 Kickers
 1967 Schwaben
 1968 Kickers
 1969 Olympic
 1970 Olympic
 1971 Croatans/Ukrainian Lions a.k.a. Chicago Lions SC (division winners)
 1972 Maroons/Ukrainian Lions a.k.a. Chicago Lions SC (division winners)
 1973 Croatian
 1974 Ukrainian Lions a.k.a. Chicago Lions SC
 1982 Schwaben
 1990 Schwaben
 1992 The Liths
 2004 Winged Bull
 2005 Jahbat F.C.
 2006 RWB Adria
 2007 RWB Adria
 2008 Deportivo Meridienne
 2009 Inferno SC
 2010 RWB Adria
 2011 RWB Adria
 2012 RWB Adria
 2013 Gazelle SC
 2014 RWB Adria
 2015 RWB Adria
 2016 RWB Adria
 2017 Vikings
 2018 RWB Adria & Gazelle SC co-champions
 2019 RWB Adria
 2020 season not played due to the COVID-19 pandemic
 2021 RWB Adria
 2022 AFC ROSCOE

References

External links
 League homepage
 American Soccer Archives article
 History of soccer in Chicago

 
1938 establishments in Illinois
United States Adult Soccer Association leagues
Sports leagues established in 1938
Regional Soccer leagues in the United States